Ivan Krstitelj Rabljanin (1470–1540) was a famous cannon and bell founder in bronze; born in Rab, most of his works are in Dubrovnik.

He made cannons for Italy, Spain and Republic of Dubrovnik. In 1506 he forged a bell that still hangs today, in Dubrovnik Bell Tower. His most beautiful cannon was built in 1537 named 'lizzard', on the tower Lovrijenac.

Sources
Ivan Krstitelj Rabljanin 

1470 births
1540 deaths
Croatian artists
People from Rab
16th-century Venetian people
Republic of Ragusa
Venetian period in the history of Croatia